Royal Air Force Lakenheath or RAF Lakenheath  is a Royal Air Force station near the village of Lakenheath in Suffolk, England, UK,  north-east of Mildenhall and  west of Thetford. The base also sits close to Brandon.

Despite being an RAF station, Lakenheath currently only hosts United States Air Force (USAF) units and personnel. The host wing is the 48th Fighter Wing (48 FW), also known as the Liberty Wing, assigned to United States Air Forces in Europe - Air Forces Africa (USAFE-AFAFRICA). The wing operates the F-15E Strike Eagle and the F-35A Lightning II.

History

First World War
The first use of Lakenheath Warren as a Royal Flying Corps airfield was during the First World War, when the area was made into a bombing and ground-attack range for aircraft flying from RFC Feltwell and RFC Thetford.

Second World War
In 1940, the Air Ministry selected Lakenheath as an alternative for nearby RAF Mildenhall and used it as a decoy airfield.

Lakenheath was used by RAF flying units on detachment late in 1941. The station soon functioned as a Mildenhall satellite with Short Stirling bombers of No. 149 Squadron dispersed from the parent airfield as conditions allowed. The squadron exchanged its Vickers Wellingtons for Stirlings late in November 1941. After becoming fully operational with its new aircraft, the squadron moved into Lakenheath on 6 April 1942 and remained until mid 1944 when the squadron moved to RAF Methwold in Norfolk. One Stirling pilot, Flight Sergeant Rawdon Middleton, was posthumously awarded the Victoria Cross for valour on the night of 28–29 November 1942, when despite serious face wounds and loss of blood from shell-fire during a raid on the Fiat works at Turin in Italy, he brought the damaged aircraft back towards southern England. With fuel nearly exhausted his crew were ordered to bail out.

On 21 June 1943, No. 199 Squadron was established as a second Stirling squadron. It conducted mine laying operations at sea before moving to RAF North Creake in Norfolk on 1 May 1944. No. 149 Squadron ended its association with RAF Lakenheath the same month, taking its Stirlings to RAF Methwold. The reason for the departure of the two bomber squadrons was Lakenheath's selection for upgrading to a Very Heavy Bomber airfield.

Cold War

Strategic Air Command

Cold War tensions with the Soviet Union in Europe began as early as 1946. In November, President Harry S. Truman ordered Strategic Air Command (SAC) B-29 Superfortress bombers to Europe. Truman decided to realign United States Air Force Europe (USAFE) into a permanent combat-capable force. In July, B-29s of the SAC 2nd Bombardment Group were deployed to Lakenheath. The first USAFE host unit at Lakenheath was the 7504th Base Completion Squadron, being activated in 1949. The 3909th moved to RAF Greenham Common in Berkshire during 1954, and was replaced by the 3910th Air Base Group in 1955.
On 30 April 1956, two Lockheed U-2s were airlifted to Lakenheath to form CIA Detachment A. The first flight of the U-2 was on 21 May. The Central Intelligence Agency unit did not remain long, moving to Wiesbaden Air Base, West Germany in June 1956.

On 10 October 1956, a United States Navy Douglas R6D-1 Liftmaster disappeared over the Atlantic Ocean after departure from RAF Lakenheath for a flight to Lajes Field in the Azores. The aircraft was on a Military Air Transport Service flight carrying 50 members of the 307th Bombardment Wing, on their way home to the United States after a temporary duty assignment and a U.S. Navy crew of nine. All 59 personnel on board were lost.

48th Tactical Fighter Wing 
Following French president Charles de Gaulle's insistence in 1959 that all non-French nuclear-capable forces should be withdrawn from his country, the USAF began a redeployment of its North American F-100-equipped units from France. The 48th Fighter Wing left its base at Chaumont-Semoutiers Air Base, France on 15 January 1960, its aircraft arriving at Lakenheath that afternoon.

The tactical components of the 48th TFW upon arrival at Lakenheath were:

492d Tactical Fighter Squadron (LR, blue colours)
493d Tactical Fighter Squadron (LS, yellow colours)
494th Tactical Fighter Squadron (LT, red colours)

The period between 1972 and 1977 can be described as a five-year aircraft conversion. Beginning in late 1971, the 48th TFW started its conversion to the McDonnell Douglas F-4D Phantom II. The conversion to the F-4D took several years, with initial operational capability being achieved on 1 July 1975. The F-4's service with the 48th Tactical Fighter Wing was short, as operation "Ready Switch" resulted in 48th Tactical Fighter Wing receiving General Dynamics F-111s Mountain Home AFB, Idaho in October 1976.

African American GIs' Experiences at the Lakenheath Airbase during Cold War 
After the US desegregated races within the military in 1948, a little community of mixed-race children, whose mothers were British and whose fathers were black GIs based in Lakenheath, was formed in Norwich.

Vanessa Baird, whose father was a black GI based in Lakenheath airfield and whose mother was a Liverpudlian was born in April 1958. Her father did not know about the birth. Her mother's family was very disapproving after they found out. So Vanessa and her mother went to Norwich. There, according to Baird, some of the women married black GIs and went to the US with them.

Elaine Brown has a similar experience to Vanessa. Her mother met black GI Harold Grigsby when he was based at Lakenheath in the early 1950s. Her father was sent back to the US before Elaine was born in 1953. Elaine's mother told her about her father's name and that he was from Washington DC. In 1996 with her husband Elaine finally found her father and met with her American family.

Strike Eagle 
Lakenheath received its first McDonnell Douglas F-15E Strike Eagles in 1992. On 16 December 1992, the last F-111 departed the base. Along with its departure, the 493d FS was inactivated, but then reactivated as an F-15 Eagle squadron.

On 2 March 2011, members of the 48th Security Forces Squadron were involved in a shooting at Frankfurt Airport in Germany. The members were on a bus bound for Ramstein Air Base in Germany when they were attacked by a lone gunman.

On 22 March 2011, F-15E 91-0304 crash-landed and was destroyed in eastern Libya after reportedly suffering from a mechanical failure. Both crewmen ejected and were safely recovered. On 7 January 2014, a Sikorsky HH-60 Pave Hawk from the base crashed following a bird strike while on a low-level training exercise with another helicopter (also a Pave Hawk), into the Cley Marshes near Cley next the Sea on the nearby North Norfolk coast. All four occupants died in the crash.

On 8 October 2014, F-15D 86-0182 belonging to the 493d Fighter Squadron crashed during a training flight in a field outside Spalding, Lincolnshire. The pilot successfully ejected and was shortly recovered back to Lakenheath on board a Pave Hawk.

A U.S. Marine Corps Boeing F/A-18 Hornet of VMFA-232 "Red Devils" from MCAS Miramar, California, crashed after taking off from RAF Lakenheath on 21 October 2015. The pilot, Major Taj "Cabbie" Sareen (34), did not survive.

In addition to supporting three combat-ready squadrons of fighter aircraft, the Liberty Wing housed the 56th Rescue Squadron's HH-60G combat search and rescue helicopters. The 56th Rescue Squadron re-located to Aviano Air Base in 2018.

The body of pilot 1st Lt. Kenneth Allen was found deceased.

F-35

F-35A Lightning II 
In January 2015, the U.S. Department of Defense announced that from 2020, Lakenheath would become home to 54 of the US Air Force's Lockheed Martin F-35A Lightning II multi-role fighters. The aircraft would be split between two squadrons and there would be an increase of 1,200 military personnel and between 60 and 100 civilian workers at the station. The F-35 would operate alongside the two existing F-15E squadrons based at Lakenheath. By November 2018, the number of aircraft had been revised to 48.

The 495th Fighter Squadron was reactivated on 1 October 2021 to be the first Lightning II squadron at Lakenheath, with the first aircraft arriving on 15 December 2021.

F-35 Infrastructure 
To accommodate the new aircraft, a F-35 Campus is being constructed on the south side of the airfield. The main new operational buildings being developed as part of the F-35 project are as follows:

 Two six-bay maintenance hangars – Space for service, maintenance, storage, and staff support facilities (to be known as Hangars 4-1 and 4–2).
 Hangar 6 (Consolidated Parts Store) – Single-storey extension to the southern side of Hangar 6, including offices and warehouses and the storage of aircraft equipment and parts.
 Dual Squadron Operations/Aircraft Maintenance Unit – A three-storey building to provide combined facilities for two squadrons comprising Squadron Operations and Aircraft Maintenance Unit (AMU) facilities, including mission planning, administration space in the operations section and offices to manage the maintenance of aircraft and storage space.
 Corrosion control and wash rack facility – Comprising single-storey hangar to maintain aircraft including a paint and sanding booth and wash rack.
 Flight simulator facility – Comprising a single-storey building to accommodate six F-35A flight simulators, administration, records, classrooms, brief/debrief rooms, and storage space.
 A Field Training Detachment Facility, comprising A three-storey building to provide F-35A training programme to maintain the aircraft, incorporating classrooms and administration rooms.  Field Training Detachment Facility – A three-storey building to provide F-35A maintenance, including classrooms and administration rooms.
 Aircraft Ground Equipment (AGE) Facilities – A single storey building extension and new covered storage associated with an existing building used for maintenance and storage of AGE related to the F-35A.
 Fuel System Maintenance Dock – A single storey hangar with fuel system maintenance dock to support the operation of the F-35A.
 Munitions Maintenance Facility – A single storey building extension and new covered storage to an existing building for the maintenance of munitions used by the F-35A.
 Residential accommodation – A three or four-storey dormitory for up to 144 beds to accommodate the increase in station personnel.
 Flight-line Dining Facility 
 Munitions Storage Administration Maintenance building
 Hospital – Replacement medical facility up to four storeys to provide inpatient services, outpatient and speciality care clinics, ancillary services, support and medical administrative functions.
 High school – A three or four-storey building to house approximately 560 students.

The airfield operational surfaces are also being expanded as follows:

 Charlie Apron, currently used by F-15's will be redeveloped and extended to allow the parking of up to forty-two F-35A aircraft in dual-occupancy shelters constructed from a light weight, canopy structure with open sides. The total area of Charlie Apron once extended will be approximately 78,392 square metres, combining the retained area of 58,780 square metres with the new area of 19,612 square metres. It will be connected to Maintenance Hangars 4-1 and 4-2 and the Squadron Operations/AMU building.
 Alpha-Bravo Apron will be extended to accommodate existing F-15 aircraft currently using Charlie Apron. The total area of Alpha-Bravo Apron once extended will be approximately 54,179 square metres, combining the retained area of 39,750 square metres with the new area of 14,429 square metres. Up to thirty-eight F-15 aircraft will be capable of being accommodated on the open apron which would not feature any shelters.

Infrastructure delivery 
Investment of $148.4 million (£116.7M) for the delivery of F-35A infrastructure at Lakenheath was authorised by the US administration in August 2018.

In November 2018, the Defence Infrastructure Organisation awarded a £160M contract for infrastructure work to a joint venture between Kier Group and VolkerFitzpatrick.

To make way for the F-35 Campus, demolition of the first of eighteen buildings began in March 2019. The work on Alpha-Bravo Apron was completed in August 2020, allowing F-15E Strike Eagle operations of the 492nd and 494th Fighter Squadrons to be consolidated on one ramp.

Accidents involving nuclear weapons

Two accidents involving nuclear weapons happened at RAF Lakenheath, in 1956 and 1961.

Based units
Flying and notable non-flying units based at RAF Lakenheath.

United States Air Force 
United States Air Forces in Europe - Air Forces Africa (USAFE-AFAFRICA)

 48th Fighter Wing
 48th Operations Group
 48th Operations Support Squadron
492nd Fighter Squadron – F-15E Strike Eagle
 493rd Fighter Squadron – F-35A Lightning II
 494th Fighter Squadron – F-15E Strike Eagle
 495th Fighter Squadron – F-35A Lightning II
 48th Maintenance Group
 48th Aircraft Maintenance Squadron 
 48th Component Maintenance Squadron
 48th Equipment Maintenance Squadron 
 48th Maintenance Operations Squadron 
 48th Munitions Squadron 
748th Aircraft Maintenance Squadron 
 48th Medical Group
 48th Dental Squadron
 48th Inpatient Operations Squadron
 48th Medical Operations Squadron
 48th Medical Support Squadron
 48th Surgical Operations Squadron
 48th Mission Support Group
 48th Civil Engineer Squadron
 48th Communications Squadron
 48th Contracting Squadron
 48th Force Support Squadron
 48th Logistics Readiness Squadron
 48th Security Forces Squadron

Heritage

Gate guardian 
RAF Lakenheath's gate guardian is North American F-100D Super Sabre, serial number '54-2269'. The aircraft was originally delivered to the French Air Force. On return it was moved to the "Wings of Liberty Memorial Park" at RAF Lakenheath. Firstly it was painted as '55-4048', latterly as '56-3319'.

Protests

Since the base's founding, RAF Lakenheath has been targeted for numerous peace protests from groups such as Stop the war coalition and the Campaign for Nuclear Disarmament.

Pershing
Lakenheath was one of the proposed sites of the NATO Pershing II Missile System. The deployment of the Missile system sparked protests all over Western Europe, and RAF Lakenheath was one of the most prominent military sites. The radical historian E.P. Thompson wrote in a pamphlet that basing the system at RAF Lakenheath directly endangered the lives of those in the nearby city of Cambridge:"...Lakenheath is, by crow or cruise, just over twenty miles from Cambridge. It is possible that Cambridge but less probable that Oxford will fall outside the CEP. Within the CEP we must suppose some fifteen or twenty detonations at least on the scale  of  Hiroshima, without taking into account any possible detonations, release of radio-active materials, etc., if the strike should succeed in finding out the cruise missiles at which it was aimed." A semi-permanent 'peace camp' was set up outside RAF Lakenheath. In 1985, the future Archbishop of Canterbury Rowan Williams was arrested for singing psalms at a CND protest at Lakenheath.

Libya 
Over 1,000 people demonstrated outside RAF Lakenheath in protest at the 1986 United States bombing of Libya.

Iraq war and later
The 2003 invasion of Iraq sparked a new wave of peace protests. In one incident, 9 protestors gained access to the base by cutting through its perimeter fence.The protestors rode bicycles along the main runway, before chaining themselves together.

Activists later established a 'peace camp' outside RAF Lakenheath to draw attention to the base.

In 2006, a group of 200 people protested against the alleged nuclear weapons stored at RAF Lakenheath. Addressing the crowd was Jeremy Corbyn, who cycled to RAF Lakenheath from the railway station in Ely. There were further protests on this issue in 2008.

Gallery

See also
List of Royal Air Force stations
Strategic Air Command in the United Kingdom
United States Air Force in the United Kingdom
United States Air Forces in Europe - Air Forces Africa

References

Citations

Bibliography

 Maurer, Maurer. Air Force Combat Units of World War II. Washington, DC: U.S. Government Printing Office 1961 (republished 1983, Office of Air Force History).
 Ravenstein, Charles A. Air Force Combat Wings Lineage and Honors Histories 1947–1977. Maxwell Air Force Base, Alabama: Office of Air Force History 1984. .
 Fletcher, Harry R. (1989) Air Force Bases Volume II, Active Air Force Bases outside the United States of America on 17 September 1982. Maxwell AFB, Alabama: Office of Air Force History. 
Rogers, Brian (2005). United States Air Force Unit Designations Since 1978. Hinkley, England: Midland Publications. .
Joe Baugher's Encyclopedia of American Aircraft
USAAS-USAAC-USAAF-USAF Aircraft Serial Numbers—1908 to Present
Strategic-Air-Command.com

External links 

 
UK Military Aeronautical Information Publication – Lakenheath (EGUL)

Royal Air Force stations in Suffolk
Installations of the United States Air Force in the United Kingdom
Airports in England
Airports established in 1943
RAF
Installations of Strategic Air Command
Royal Air Force stations of World War II in the United Kingdom